Luke Anthony Donnellan (born 26 March 1966) is a former Australian politician. He was a Labor Party member of the Victorian Legislative Assembly between 2002 and his retirement in 2022, representing Narre Warren North. He was the Minister for Child Protection and the Minister for Disability, Ageing and Carers in the Second Andrews Ministry from December 2018 until October 2021. He also served as the Minister for Roads and Road Safety and Minister for Ports in the First Andrews Ministry from December 2014 to December 2018. He was a key figure in the lease of the Port of Melbourne, and led negotiations with cross benchers to enable the legislation to pass through the Victorian Parliament. He is associated with the Labor Unity faction.

Political career

Entry into politics

In 2002, Donnellan was preselected as the Labor candidate for Narre Warren North, a new seat with a notional Liberal majority. He defeated the Liberal candidate and has held the seat since. In 2006, he was appointed Parliamentary Secretary for Treasury and Finance, and was promoted in August 2007 to Parliamentary Secretary to the Premier.

Andrews Government

Following Labor's win at the 2014 Victorian state election, Donnellan was appointed Minister for Roads and Road Safety and Minister for Ports by Premier Daniel Andrews.

After Labor's reelection in 2018 Donnellan was appointed Minister for Child Protection and Minister for Disability, Ageing and Carers.

In an Independent Broad-based Anti-corruption Commission (IBAC) hearing in October 2021, an admitted branch-stacker federal Labor MP Anthony Byrne claimed that Donnellan was involved in Byrne's activities.  Subsequently, Donnellan resigned from the Victorian Cabinet. On 13 December 2021, Donnellan was not preselected again for Narre Warren North by the Socialist Left-dominated ALP National Executive and as a result will not run for re-election in the 2022 Victorian state election.

Personal life
Donnellan was born in Melbourne, and attended Xavier College 1977–84 where he was involved in sports, captaining the hockey team and competing in 1sts rowing. He received a Bachelor of Commerce from the University of Melbourne in 1987 and became a commercial real estate agent. After periods as a planning finance consultant and a client services manager, he became an advisor to various Labor MPs, and was a member of the Administrative Committee from 1999.

Donnellan lives in Fitzroy North.

References

External links
 Parliamentary voting record of Luke Donnellan at Victorian Parliament Tracker
 Website
 Member Profile
 Facebook page

|-

1966 births
Living people
Australian Labor Party members of the Parliament of Victoria
Labor Right politicians
Members of the Victorian Legislative Assembly
21st-century Australian politicians
People educated at Xavier College
Politicians from Melbourne
People from Fitzroy, Victoria